The 1986 UNLV Rebels football team was an American football team that represented the University of Nevada, Las Vegas in the Pacific Coast Athletic Association during the 1986 NCAA Division I-A football season. In their first year under head coach Wayne Nunnely, the team compiled a 6–5 record.

Schedule

References

UNLV
UNLV Rebels football seasons
UNLV Rebels football